The canton of Lingolsheim is an administrative division of the Bas-Rhin department, northeastern France. It was created at the French canton reorganisation which came into effect in March 2015. Its seat is in Lingolsheim.

It consists of the following communes:

Achenheim
Blaesheim
Breuschwickersheim
Entzheim
Fegersheim
Geispolsheim
Hangenbieten
Holtzheim
Kolbsheim
Lingolsheim
Lipsheim
Oberschaeffolsheim
Osthoffen

References

Cantons of Bas-Rhin